Goga Basket is an Albanian basketball team that plays in the Albanian Basketball League.

Domestic achievements 
Albanian Basketball League (1): 
2019
Albanian Basketball Cup (1):
2020

References

Goga
Durrës
Basketball teams established in 2015